Cesar Zambrano (born July 12, 1984) is an American professional soccer player. Attended Brother Rice High School (Chicago). He attended college at the University of Illinois at Chicago.

Zambrano spent two seasons, 2006 and 2007, with the Chicago Fire Premier in the fourth division Premier Development League.

External links
 
 
 
 

1984 births
Living people
American soccer players
UIC Flames men's soccer players
Chicago Fire U-23 players
Colorado Rapids players
USL League Two players
Major League Soccer players
Colorado Rapids draft picks
Soccer players from Chicago
Association football midfielders
University of Illinois Chicago alumni